Guzmania (tufted airplant) is a genus of over 120 species of flowering plants in the botanical family Bromeliaceae, subfamily Tillandsioideae. They are mainly stemless, evergreen, epiphytic perennials native to Florida, the West Indies, southern Mexico, Central America, and northern and western South America.

The genus is named after Spanish pharmacist and naturalist, Anastasio Guzman.

Several species of this genus are cultivated as indoor and outdoor garden plants. The best known is Guzmania lingulata (scarlet star) which bears orange and red bracts.

The plant dies after it has produced its flowers in summer, but new plants can easily be propagated from the offsets which appear as the parent plant dies. They are epiphytes and can do well if tied on to pieces of bark with roots bound into sphagnum moss.

Guzmanias require warm temperatures and relatively high humidity. The sac fungus Bipolaris sorokiniana (anamorph of Cochliobolus sativus) and others can cause fatal root rot in plants of this genus if the roots get too wet and cold.

Species

, the World Checklist of Selected Plant Families recognizes 215 species, including hybrids.

Notable cultivars
Hybrids:
 cv. 'Rana'
 Wittmackii-Hybrids
 Zahnii-Hybrids

References

External links
BSI Genera Gallery photos

 
Epiphytes
Bromeliaceae genera